Dress Me Up  may refer to:
 Dress Me Up! (album), an album by Denise Ho
 "Dress Me Up" (song), a song by Olivia Lufkin

See also
 "Dress You Up"
 Dress-up
 Jesus Dress Up